Długołęka is a village in Wrocław County, Lower Silesian Voivodeship, in south-western Poland. It is the seat of the administrative district (gmina) called Gmina Długołęka.

The village has a population of 2,620.

History
The first references to the village date back to the 13th century, when it was part of fragmented Piast-ruled Poland. Later on, it also passed to Bohemia (Czechia), Prussia and Germany. A labour camp of the Reich Labour Service was operated in the village under Nazi Germany. It became again part of Poland following Germany's defeat in World War II in 1945.

Transport
The village possesses a train station.

References

Villages in Wrocław County